Grimsargh railway station was on the single track Preston and Longridge Railway.  It served the village of Grimsargh in Lancashire, England.

When the line first opened in 1840, wagons carrying quarried stone ran downhill from Longridge to Preston and were hauled in the other direction by horses. There were rudimentary passenger facilities at Grimsargh — the nearby Plough Hotel was used as a booking office. It was not until 1870 that a proper station building was constructed, when the line was run jointly by the Lancashire and Yorkshire Railway and the London and North Western Railway.
 
In 1889, the privately run Whittingham Hospital Railway was opened to a second Grimsargh Station which was diagonally opposite the level crossing from the main station.  This station had a run-around loop and a connection with the Longridge line facing in the direction of Longridge.  Two sidings were also provided.  On a single short platform, the station building comprised an open fronted shed of brick and wood with an overall roof and canopy.  The building was some 40 ft (12 m) in length by 12 ft (3.6 m) wide with a 10 ft (3 m) waiting room at the Longridge end. Hospital trains were timed to connect with trains to and from Preston.

The Longridge-to-Preston line closed to passengers in 1930, but the hospital line continued to be used until 1957 when its single steam locomotive was condemned. The Longridge line's goods service was finally withdrawn in 1967. The station's buildings were demolished in the late 1970s and houses built on the site, the new houses following the alignment of the former station buildings.

Notes

References 

 Aubertin, C. (2006) "Solving a Victorian Problem", Steam World, 232 (October), p. 26-31
 Biddle, Gordon (1989) The Railways Around Preston—A Historical Review, Scenes from the past, 6, Foxline Publishing, 
 Suggitt, G. (2003, revised 2004) Lost Railways of Lancashire, Countryside Books, Newbury, 
 Till, J.M. (1993) A History of Longridge and its People, Carnegie Publishing, Preston, 

Disused railway stations in the City of Preston
Former Preston and Longridge Railway stations
Railway stations in Great Britain opened in 1840
Railway stations in Great Britain closed in 1930